Davit Kvirkvelia (born 27 June 1980), nicknamed Dato, is a Georgian football manager and a former player. He is the head coach of Kolkheti-1913 Poti.

Club career
Kvirkvelia left for FC Alania Vladikavkaz in February 2005  and moved to FC Metalurh Zaporizhya in March 2006.

International career
Kvirkvelia's debut with the Georgia national team was at the 2003 in UEFA Euro 2004 qualifying.

He played 10 games in UEFA Euro 2008 qualifying.

External links
 Profile at Rubin

1980 births
Living people
Footballers from Georgia (country)
Georgia (country) international footballers
Expatriate footballers from Georgia (country)
FC Dinamo Tbilisi players
FC Spartak Vladikavkaz players
FC Metalurh Zaporizhzhia players
FC Rubin Kazan players
Panionios F.C. players
Russian Premier League players
Ukrainian Premier League players
Super League Greece players
Cypriot First Division players
Expatriate footballers in Russia
Expatriate footballers in Ukraine
Expatriate sportspeople from Georgia (country) in Ukraine
Expatriate footballers in Greece
Expatriate footballers in Cyprus
Association football fullbacks
FC Anzhi Makhachkala players
Anorthosis Famagusta F.C. players
FC Dila Gori players
FC Metalurgi Rustavi players
Georgia (country) under-21 international footballers
FC Kolkheti-1913 Poti players
Football managers from Georgia (country)